Radical 193 or radical cauldron meaning "cauldron" or "tripod" is one of the 8 Kangxi radicals (214 radicals in total) composed of 10 strokes.

In the Kangxi Dictionary, there are 73 characters (out of 49,030) to be found under this radical.

 is also the 189th indexing component in the Table of Indexing Chinese Character Components predominantly adopted by Simplified Chinese dictionaries published in mainland China.

Evolution

Derived characters

Variant forms

Literature

See also
Zhu Rong (god)

External links

Unihan Database - U+9B32

193
189